A driving school is a formal class or program that prepares a new driver to be licensed.

Driving school may also refer to:
 
 Driving School, a 1997 British TV series
 Driving School (Alton Towers), a ride at the English theme park

de:Fahrschule
pt:Centro de formação de condutores